Jan Antonín Koželuh (also Johann Antonin Kozeluch, Koscheluch, Jan Evangelista Antonín Tomáš; 14 December 1738 in Velvary – 3 February 1814 in Prague) was a Czech composer.

Life
Koželuh was a pupil of Josef Seger and studied under the Jesuits in Brenitz. He studied in Vienna under Christoph Willibald von Gluck and Florian Gassmann. In 1784, he became a concert master in St. Vitus Cathedral for thirty years and the organist at the Strahov Monastery. His works includes 45 Masses, a Requiem, an oratorio, two operas, four symphonies, and several woodwind concertos. As one of the most respected Czech composers of his time, he also composed serious Italian operas: Allesandro nell' Indie was performed in 1769 and Demofoonte in 1772.

He was the teacher of his cousin Leopold Koželuch, whose name was originally also Jan Antonin Koželuh, but who changed his name in 1773.

References

Bibliography
 Van Boer, Bertil H.: Historical Dictionary of Music of the Classical Period, p. 314. Scarecrow Press, 2012.

External links
Operatic Works at operone.de
brief biography at classical-composers.org

1738 births
1814 deaths
Czech composers
Czech male composers
People from Kladno District